Lower Silesian Voivodeship, or Lower Silesia Province,  in southwestern Poland, is one of the 16 voivodeships (provinces) into which Poland is divided. The voivodeship was created on 1 January 1999 out of the former Wrocław, Legnica, Wałbrzych and Jelenia Góra Voivodeships, following the Polish local government reforms adopted in 1998.

It is one of the wealthiest provinces in Poland as natural resources such as copper, silver, gold, brown coal and rock materials (inter alia granite, basalt, gabbro, diabase, amphibolite, porphyry, gneiss, serpentinite, sandstone, greywacke, limestone, dolomite, bentonite, kaolinite, clay, aggregate) are widely present. Its well developed and varied industries attract both domestic and foreign investors, thus stimulating economic growth.

Its capital and largest city is Wrocław, situated on the Oder River. The voivodeship is host to many castles and palaces. For this reason tourism is a large part of this region's economy.

History

In the past 1,200 years, the region has been part of Great Moravia, the Medieval Kingdom of Poland, the Crown of Bohemia, Habsburg monarchy (Austria), Prussia, the German Empire, and modern Poland after 1945.

Silesian tribes settled the lands at the end of the first millennium after the Migration Period. During the period of Germania Slavica, the region became part of Great Moravia under Svatopluk I of Moravia. Mieszko I brought the various existing Silesian duchies under the rule of the Piast dynasty and they became the Duchy of Silesia. It was again divided into small realms reigned by Silesian branches of Piast princes after the testament of Bolesław III Wrymouth in 1138. With the Ostsiedlung, the cultural and ethnic Germanic influence grew with an influx of immigrants from the German-speaking areas of the Holy Roman Empire, of which Silesia was a direct part until the 1330s when it was subjugated to the Kingdom of Bohemia, then together with it became part of the Habsburg monarchy (1526), then the Kingdom of Prussia (1742/44), and subsequently the German Empire (1871). In 1945, Lower Silesia was made part of Poland as agreed at the post-war Potsdam Conference. As a consequence, Lower Silesia suffered a nearly total loss of its pre-war population between 1945 and 1950. Polish citizens dispossessed by the Soviets were then settled in the now emptied lands.

Lower Silesia was, during the early medieval era, one of Poland's cultural centers. The Book of Henryków (1273), which contains the earliest known sentence written in the Polish language, as well as a document which contains the oldest printed text in Polish, were both created within it. Złotoryja, Poland's first town, was granted municipal privileges according to German Magdeburg rights by Henry the Bearded. Over the centuries, Lower Silesia has experienced several epochal events such as the Protestant Reformation, the Silesian Wars, industrialisation and the two World Wars.

Geography

Although much of the region is relatively low-lying, Lower Silesia includes the Sudeten Foreland, as well as part of the Sudetes mountain range, that runs along the Polish/Czech border. Ski resorts in the Lower Silesian Voivodeship include Karpacz and Szklarska Poręba in the Karkonosze mountains. 

The voivodeship has a number of mineral springs and is host to a large number of spa towns.

Lower Silesian Voivodeship is bordered by Lubusz Voivodeship to the north-west, Greater Poland Voivodeship to the north-east, Opole Voivodeship to the south-east, the Czech Republic (Hradec Králové Region, Liberec Region, Olomouc Region and Pardubice Region) to the south, and Germany (Saxony) to the west.

Transport

The Copernicus Airport Wrocław serves as an international and domestic airport.

Wrocław Główny is the largest railway station in Poland, serving an average of 21.2 million passengers annually. It offers the domestic and international connections of various carriers.

The A4 motorway, A8 motorway, A18 motorway and S3 Expressway, S5 Expressway, S8 Expressway also run through the Voivodeship.

Tourism

Tourism is important for Lower Silesian Voivodeship. There are 99 castles and hundreds of palaces. Several are located Jelenia Góra valley alone  .

Wrocław being the largest city in the voivodeship has many sights and attractions, including the Market Square, and Wrocław's dwarfs. The Festival of Good Beer is held every year, on the second weekend of June.

The annual international Chopin Festival is held in the Fryderyk Chopin Theatre in the town of Duszniki-Zdrój. Other major attraction of the town is the Museum of Papermaking, established in a 17th-century paper mill.

Śnieżka is the highest peak of the Lower Silesian Voivodeship and the whole of the Sudetes.

Protected areas

Protected areas in Lower Silesian Voivodeship:
 2 National Parks
 Karkonosze National Park (part of a UNESCO trans-border biosphere reserve)
 Table Mountains National Park
 12 Landscape Parks
 Barycz Valley Landscape Park (partly in Greater Poland Voivodeship)
 Bóbr Valley Landscape Park
 Bystrzyca Valley Landscape Park
 Chełmy Landscape Park
 Jezierzyca Valley Landscape Park
 Książ Landscape Park
 Owl Mountains Landscape Park
 Przemków Landscape Park
 Rudawy Landscape Park
 Ślęża Landscape Park
 Śnieżnik Landscape Park
 Sudety Wałbrzyskie Landscape Park
 67 Nature reserves
 20 protected landscape areas
 3100 Natural monuments
 114 Ecological usages
 15 Teams nature and landscape
and many areas of Natura 2000 network.

Tourist routes
 The Main Trail Sudetes long-distance mountain trail
 The Piast Castles Trail
 Trail around Wrocław
 Cistercian trail
 The trail of the Valley of Palaces and Gardens of the Jelenia Góra Valley
 Lower Silesian Rout of St. James
 Sudetes Rout of St. James
 Camino de Santiago - Via Regia
 The Trail of Extinct Volcanoes on the Kaczawskie Foothills
 Lower Silesian Beer and Wine Trail
 EuroVelo 9
 Lower Silesian Bicycle Highway
 Bicycles S5 (Wrocław – Poznań)
 Blue Velo - The Odra River Bicycle Route

Economy

The Gross domestic product (GDP) of the province was 41.1 billion € in 2018, accounting for 8.3% of the Polish economic output. GDP per capita adjusted for purchasing power was €23,400  or 78% of the EU27 average in the same year. The GDP per employee was 85% of the EU average. Lower Silesia Voivodship is the province with the second highest GDP per capita in Poland.

GDP per capita in Lower Silesia Voivodeship: GDP in Poland:

The southwest part of the Voivodeship is considered part of the so-called Black Triangle, an area of heavily industrialization and environmental damage on the three-way border of Poland, Germany, and the Czech Republic.

Cities and towns

The voivodeship contains 8 cities and 83 towns. The cities (governed by a city mayor or prezydent miasta) are listed below in descending order of population (as of 2019):

Cities

Towns

Administrative division

Lower Silesian Voivodeship is divided into 30 counties (powiats), four of which are city counties. These are further divided into 169 gminas.

Lower Silesia is divided into three districts administracyji province government, the capital of Wrocław (administrative region):

 1 one district Wałbrzyski
 Powiats in the district
Świdnica, Kłodzko, Ząbkowice Śląskie, Dzierżoniów

 2 second district Legnicki
 Powiats in the district
Glogów, Jawor, Lubin, Polkowice, Złotoryja

 3 third district Jeleniogórski
 Powiats in the district
Boleslawiec, Kamienna Góra, Luban, Lwówek Śląski, Zgorzelec.

The counties are listed in the following table (ordering within categories is by decreasing population).

Governors

See also 
 Princess Marianne of the Netherlands
 Tourism in Poland

References

External links 

 Województwo Dolnośląskie Official website
 Website of the government of Lower Silesia

 
States and territories established in 1999
1999 establishments in Poland